Darwinia micropetala, commonly known as small darwinia, is a species of flowering plant in the family Myrtaceae and is endemic to south-eastern continental Australia. It is a small, erect shrub with linear leaves, and heads of white to pink flowers.

Description
The flowers are borne in upper leaf axils in compound, corymbose heads with two to four flowers in each partial head. The bracteoles are white to pink and egg-shaped with the narrower end towards the base, and often fall off as the flowers open.

Taxonomy
Darwinia micropetala was first formally described in 1858 by Victorian Government Botanist Ferdinand von Mueller who named it Genetyllis micropetala in Fragmenta Phytographiae Australiae from specimens collected by "Bannier" on Kangaroo Island. In 1865, George Bentham changed the name to Darwinia micropetala.

Distribution and habitat
Small darwinia grows in swales and near salt lakes in south-eastern South Australia and in the Little Desert area of western Victoria.

References

micropetala
Flora of South Australia
Flora of Victoria (Australia)
Taxa named by Ferdinand von Mueller
Plants described in 1858